Kaire Leibak (born 21 May 1988, in Tartu) is a retired Estonian triple jumper. Her personal best jump of 14.43 metres is the Estonian record.

She won a silver medal in the triple jump at the 2005 World Youth Championships in Athletics, where she was also seventh in the long jump. She focused solely on the triple jump from 2006 onwards and went on to win gold medals in the event at the 2006 World Junior Championships in Beijing (where she broke the national record) and the 2007 European Athletics Junior Championships.

Leibak made her senior debut in 2008 and represented Estonia at the 2008 IAAF World Indoor Championships and the 2008 Beijing Olympics. She was declared Estonian Sportspersonality of the year for her efforts. The following year she was ninth at the 2009 European Athletics Indoor Championships, but did not start the competition at the 2009 World Championships in Athletics in spite of her being selected.

She ruptured an Achilles tendon in 2010, missing the outdoor season, and later suffered a second rupture that left her unable to compete for an 18-month period. She moved to the United States and began working with an American coach, Rana Reider, who also coaches Dwight Phillips.

Achievements

References

External links

1988 births
Living people
Sportspeople from Tartu
Estonian female triple jumpers
Athletes (track and field) at the 2008 Summer Olympics
Olympic athletes of Estonia